Renata De Jesús Soñé Savery (born August 6, 1982, in New York City) is an American-born Dominican beauty pageant titleholder, model, and actress. She competed in the Miss Universe 2005 pageant, finishing 2nd Runner-Up after winning Miss Dominican Republic 2005.

Life and career
At six months of age, Soñé was left in the care of her grandparents after her mother's death. She went on to pursue a degree in clinical psychology before participating in the Miss Dominican Republic pageant. Of her long-term career goals, Soñé has said she wishes to found a children's institute to continue her interests as a psychologist. To this end, she has been the spokesperson of many campaigns headed by Dominican Attorney General Rossana Reyes designed to discourage child neglect, and curtail the high number of abandoned children through education and public awareness.

Prior to winning the national title pageant, Soñé was a professional model with Ossygeno Model Management, appearing in several Dominican fashion periodicals. Soñé has since become the official face of Pantene shampoo, Avon, and Esbelle weight loss product.

Pageant participation

Miss Dominican Republic 2005
Soñé competed in the Miss Dominican Republic 2005 pageant on April 9, 2005, representing Distrito Nacional, where she won the title and gained the right to represent the Dominican Republic at Miss Universe.

Miss Universe 2005
She went on to compete in the Miss Universe 2005 pageant held in Bangkok, Thailand, where she finished third overall (2nd runner-up), ahead of Mónica Spear (Venezuela) and Laura Elizondo (Mexico) and behind Cynthia Olavarría (Puerto Rico) and winner Natalie Glebova (Canada). She appears in the Miss Universe Organization's book "Universal Beauty" as the contestant with the best body in the history of the pageant.

Film and television
She made her screen debut in the Dominican film Un Macho de Mujer (2006), which starred Venezuelan television host Daniel Sarcos. and hosted the weekly television dating show, Cupido (Cupid) in 2008. She currently hosts a daily television show "Todo Bien" on Antena Latina.

Apart from hosting "Todo Bien", she currently hosts her own radio show "Renata Soñé por la 91" every Sunday. The show focuses on music from the 70s, 80s and 90s.
Soñé is set to star in the thriller "Intercambio" in the spring of 2011, a co-production of Virafilms and Alfa Films in which she plays detective Ximena Salba.

Business

Soñé became an entrepreneur in 2006 when she successfully launched her own luxury collection of eyeglasses Renata Soñé Eye Wear.

Personal life

She dated professional tennis player Jorge Dueñas. 
She married her childhood sweetheart, businessman Eduardo Guerra Gutiérrez on June 14, 2006, in an ceremony in Casa de Campo. The couple has two sons, Ignacio de Jesús born in late 2006 and Rodrigo Antonio born in October 2011.

References 

1982 births
American people of Dominican Republic descent
Dominican Republic beauty pageant winners
Dominican Republic female models
Living people
Miss Dominican Republic
Miss Universe 2005 contestants
Models from New York City